West Hempstead is the terminal station at the east end of the Long Island Rail Road's West Hempstead Branch serving West Hempstead, New York, United States. It is located at Hempstead Avenue and Hempstead Gardens Drive.

History
Between 1870 and 1879 the Southern Hempstead Branch of the South Side Railroad of Long Island had a terminal station located on Greenwich Street further to the east. The station and the line were abandoned in May 1879, but the station itself was converted into a skating rink that burned down in July 1888.

In 1893, the Long Island Rail Road established a subsidiary that ran through West Hempstead between Valley Stream and Mineola called the New York Bay Extension Railroad Company which was merged into the LIRR nine years later. A low-cinder platform station was installed between Rockaway Road (today's Hempstead Avenue) and Fulton Street (now Hempstead Turnpike), which contained a bridge over the tracks and station for the New York and Long Island Traction Company trolleys. By 1926, the line was electrified with a substation built southeast of the current station site that remains to this day. West Hempstead Station was rebuilt in 1928 on the north side of Hempstead Avenue and relocated onto the south side of the road on September 15, 1935. The 1935 station house ran directly along a loop driveway in front of Hempstead Avenue with a canopy leading from the back door to a second canopy along the platform of the tracks. Freight spurs and team tracks spread out just south of the station, some of which ended along the south side of Hempstead Avenue. The line initially extended north and connected with the current Hempstead Branch, leading to Mineola Station, and also contained a link to the Oyster Bay Branch. It was then cut back in 1959 to its current terminus of West Hempstead. The site of the canopy along the tracks was replaced with the current brick structure, and the yards along the northwest side of the tracks were replaced by the Courtesy Hotel, which was torn down in 2011 and replaced by a group of apartment buildings.

Station layout
This station has one six-car-long island platform between the two tracks. The mostly single-tracked West Hempstead Branch expands to two tracks north of the previous station.

References

External links

Former Mineola to West Hempstead Branch (Unofficial LIRR History Web Site)
West Hempstead Branch (TrainsAreFun.com)
 Station House from Google Maps Street View (Exterior)
Station House from Google Maps Street View(Interior)
Platform from Google Maps Street View

Long Island Rail Road stations in Nassau County, New York
Railway stations in the United States opened in 1928